Megachile duboulaii is a species of bee in the family Megachilidae. It was described by Smith in 1865.

References

Duboulaii
Insects described in 1865